Martin McNiff (born 23 August 1991) is a Scottish footballer who plays for Dumbarton as a defender. McNiff has previously played for Dumbarton, Annan Athletic, Clyde and Stirling Albion.

McNiff started his career as a youth player at Dumbarton, making his debut in 2008 as a 17-year-old whilst still at school in a 3-1 victory against Albion Rovers. He established himself in the first team over the following three seasons, including making 29 appearances as the Sons won promotion to the Scottish First Division via the playoffs in 2011/12.  in 2012-13 he joined Annan Athletic on loan, before spending a second spell at Galabank in 2013-14. He signed a permanent deal with the club in the summer of 2014.

McNiff then joined Clyde in 2016, becoming the first Clyde defender to score ten goals in one season since 1934–35 in April 2019 and the first defender to register ten goals from open play. The team won promotion to League One in 2018–19. At the PFA Scotland awards, he was named in Team of the Year for League Two He returned to Dumbarton after a season with Stirling Albion in May 2022.

Career statistics

References

1991 births
Living people
Scottish footballers
Dumbarton F.C. players
Annan Athletic F.C. players
Clyde F.C. players
Scottish Football League players
Scottish Professional Football League players
Association football midfielders
Stirling Albion F.C. players